Vegadeo (variant: A Veiga) is one of six parishes in Vegadeo, a municipality of the same name, within the province and autonomous community of Asturias, in northern Spain. 

Villages and hamlets
 Estelo
 A Fonte Louteiro (Fuente de Louteiro)
 Louteiro
 Miou
 Vegadeo

References

Parishes in Vegadeo